Sandra Robatscher (born 13 December 1995 in Bolzano) is an Italian luger. She is the niece of fellow luger Armin Zöggeler.

Robatscher competed at the 2014 Winter Olympics for Italy. In the Women's singles she placed 22nd.

As of September 2017, Robatscher's best Luge World Cup overall finish is 16th in 2015–16. In February 2019 she took her first World Cup win at Altenberg in a race shortened to one run as the second run was cancelled because of heavy snow.

References

External links
 

1995 births
Living people
Italian female lugers
Lugers at the 2014 Winter Olympics
Lugers at the 2018 Winter Olympics
Olympic lugers of Italy
Sportspeople from Bolzano
Italian lugers